Patten College is a private aided secondary school for boys in Mauritius.

See also 
 List of secondary schools in Mauritius

References

External links 

Secondary schools in Mauritius
Boys' schools in Mauritius
Educational institutions with year of establishment missing